The velar ejective affricate is a type of consonantal sound, used in some spoken languages.

Features
Features of the velar ejective affricate:

Occurrence

See also
 List of phonetic topics
 k𝼄ʼ

Notes

External links
 

Affricates
Velar consonants
Ejectives
Oral consonants
Central consonants